Lake Addie is a body of water located three miles southeast of Binford in Addie Township, Griggs County, North Dakota. It is managed as a walleye and perch fishery. At times of low water, an isthmus separates the lake into north and south segments.

References

Addie
Bodies of water of Griggs County, North Dakota